Victoria "Vicky" Persinger (born June 1, 1992) is an American curler from Fairbanks, Alaska. She is a three-time United States Women's National Champion.

Career
Persinger competed in eight United States Junior Championships, winning gold at her last appearance in 2013. As national champions, they represented the United States at the 2012 World Junior Championships in Östersund, Sweden, where they finished in seventh place with a 4–5 record.

Since aging out of juniors, Persinger has medalled at every Women's National Championship she has competed in, six in a row as of 2020. At her first Women's Nationals in 2015, she played lead for skip Aileen Sormunen, they were the number one seed in the page playoffs but lost to Erika Brown in the 1 vs 2 game and to Patti Lank in the semifinals to finish with the bronze medal. Despite their third-place finish, Team Sormunen still earned the opportunity to represent the United States at the 2015 World Women's Championship because, of the top three teams at Nationals, they earned the most Order of Merit points throughout the season. They finished in tenth place with a 3–8 record.

At the 2016 Nationals, Persinger won silver with skip Nina Roth, losing the final to Erika Brown. The next season Persinger joined Jamie Sinclair's new team at second, along with third Alex Carlson and lead Monica Walker. Team Sinclair found success, winning the 2017 National Championship, but missed out on going to the World Championship due to Roth earning more points throughout the season. They also played on the winning North American Team at the 2017 Continental Cup of Curling and made it to the quarterfinals of the last Grand Slam of the season, the 2017 Humpty's Champions Cup.

The team started the 2017–18 season by winning the AMJ Campbell Shorty Jenkins Classic, a WCT event. At the 2017 United States Olympic Curling Trials, they missed their chance to play in the 2018 Winter Olympics when they lost a close three game final series to Nina Roth's team. Later that season they defended their national title, winning the 2018 United States Women's Curling Championship. Representing the United States at the 2018 World Women's Championship, they finished fourth, losing the bronze medal game to Russia's Victoria Moiseeva. Persinger and Team Sinclair made history at the 2018 Players' Championship when they became the first American team to win a Grand Slam event. They finished the season with another quarterfinal finish at the 2018 Humpty's Champions Cup.

For the 2018–19 season, Persinger moved to playing third on Cory Christensen's team, which also included Madison Bear at lead and Jenna Martin at second. The team's coach was Canadian Darah Blandford, in her first year with the USCA High Performance Program. Team Christensen was chosen to represent the United States at the third leg of the Curling World Cup in Jönköping, Sweden; the Curling World Cup was a four-part international tournament held around the world throughout the curling season.  There they finished with a 3–3 record.

At the 2019 United States Women's Championship, Persinger and Team Christensen finished the round-robin with a record of 5–2, good enough for the third seed in the page playoffs. In the 3 vs. 4 playoff game, they defeated Stephanie Senneker's team by one point, 9–8. The semifinal match against Nina Roth's team came down to the last stone, but Roth came through with the win, resulting in Persinger's second bronze medal. Persinger temporarily rejoined Sinclair's team, as alternate, for the 2019 World Championship where the team went 6–6, finishing in seventh place.

Shortly after the season, however, it was announced that Christensen's team was dissolving; Martin decided to step away from competitive curling, Bear became skip of her own team, and Christensen and Persinger joined Sinclair's team. So after one season away Persinger was back at second on Team Sinclair, now with Christensen at third, Taylor Anderson at lead, Sarah Anderson as alternate, and Cathy Overton-Clapham as coach. On the WCT the team won the Red Deer Curling Classic and followed it a couple of weeks later by making it to the quarterfinals at the Curl Mesabi Classic, where they lost to Tabitha Peterson's team.

At the 2020 United States Women's Championship, Persinger and Team Sinclair only lost one game in the round-robin, earning the number one seed in the playoffs. In the 1 vs. 2 page playoff, they lost to Tabitha Peterson's team, who they faced again in the final after defeating Ariel Traxler's junior team in the semifinals. Peterson defeated Team Sinclair a second time in the final, with a final score of 7–5, resulting in Persinger's second Women's Nationals silver medal.

Personal life
Persinger started curling in 1997 when she was five years old.

Persinger's cousin Greg is also an accomplished curler, having won the United States Men's Championship twice. Her sister Tina and cousin Chad are also curlers. All four played together and finished in fourth place at the 2015 United States Mixed Curling Championship.

She graduated from University of Alaska Anchorage. She currently works as a user support specialist at Title Insurance Company.

Teams

Women's

Mixed

Mixed doubles

References

External links

 Team Cory Christensen - Grand Slam of Curling (web archive; February 21, 2019)

Living people
1992 births
Sportspeople from Fairbanks, Alaska
American female curlers
American curling champions
Continental Cup of Curling participants
University of Alaska Anchorage alumni
21st-century American women
Curlers at the 2022 Winter Olympics
Olympic curlers of the United States